Gene Chandler (born Eugene Drake Dixon; July 6, 1937) is an American singer, songwriter, music producer, and record-label executive. Chandler is nicknamed "the Duke of Earl" or, simply, "the Duke." He is best known for his most successful songs, "Duke of Earl" and "Groovy Situation", and his association with the Dukays, the Impressions, and Curtis Mayfield.

Chandler is a Grammy Hall of Fame inductee and a recipient of the Rhythm and Blues Foundation's Pioneer Award. He is one of the few singers to achieve chart success spanning the doo-wop, rhythm and blues, soul and disco musical eras, with some top-40 pop and R&B chart hits between 1961 and 1986. Chandler was inducted as a performer into the Rhythm and Blues Music Hall of Fame on August 24, 2014. In 2016, he became a double inductee in the R&B Music Hall of Fame with his induction as an R&B music pioneer.

Early years
Chandler was born Eugene Drake Dixon in Chicago on July 6, 1937. He attended Englewood High School on the city's South Side. Chandler began performing during the early 1950s with the Gaytones. He joined the Dukays with James Lowe, Shirley Jones, Earl Edwards and Ben Broyles in 1957, soon becoming their lead singer. After being drafted into the U.S. Army, Chandler returned to Chicago in 1960 and rejoined the Dukays.

Career
The Dukays were offered a recording contract by Nat Records and recorded "The Girl Is a Devil" (1961), a single, with producers Carl Davis and Bill "Bunky" Sheppard. This was followed by a session in August 1961 which resulted in four songs, including "Nite Owl" and "Duke of Earl". Nat Records released "Nite Owl", and it became an R&B success by the end of the year. Davis and Sheppard shopped "Duke of Earl" to Vee-Jay Records, which released it in 1962 by Dixon (known as Gene Chandler).

"Duke of Earl" sold one million copies in a little over a month, and was awarded a gold disc by the RIAA. After the song spent three weeks at number one on the Billboard charts, Chandler purchased a cape, monocle, cane and top hat and advertised himself as the Duke of Earl. He appeared in costume singing "Duke of Earl" in Don't Knock the Twist, a 1962 film featuring Chubby Checker. Chandler's concerts became popular, and he performed encoresusually "Rainbow", a Curtis Mayfield song.

Chandler left Vee-Jay in the autumn of 1963 and recorded for Constellation Records, another Chicago company. After Constellation went bankrupt in 1966, he was contracted to Chess and then to Brunswick Records; for a time, Chess and Brunswick alternated in releasing Chandler's recordings. He had Top-20 hits with Constellation with "Just Be True" (1964) and "Nothing Can Stop Me" (1965), both written by Curtis Mayfield and produced by Carl Davis.

Other successes included "What Now," "Rainbow," "I Fooled You This Time," "Think Nothing About It," "A Man's Temptation," "To Be a Lover," "Rainbow '65" (recorded live at Chicago's Regal Theater), "Bless Our Love" and "You Can't Hurt Me No More." Chandler was also successful with his cover version of James Brown's "There Was a Time" and "You Threw a Lucky Punch", released as an answer song to Mary Wells' Motown hit "You Beat Me to the Punch."

After several years performing concerts, Chandler decided to become more involved with music production. He formed a production company and two record labels: Bamboo and Mister Chand. Chandler produced a hit with "Groovy Situation", released on Mercury Records in 1970, which reached number 12 on the Billboard Hot 100 and number eight on the Billboard R&B charts: his second-greatest success, after "Duke of Earl". "Groovy Situation" sold over a million copies and was certified gold by the RIAA in November of that year.

Chandler had produced "Backfield in Motion" in 1969 for Mel and Tim on Bamboo Records, which reached number three on the R&B chart and the top 10 of the Billboard Hot 100. He followed this in 1970 with "Good Guys Only Win in the Movies" for the duo; the song reached number 17 on the R&B chart and number 45 on the pop-music chart.

Later that year, Chandler recorded the album Gene and Jerry: One on One with fellow Chicago artist Jerry Butler. He also was featured along with the Impressions, LeRoy Hutson and Curtis Mayfield on the live album, Curtis in Chicago (1973). Chandler sang on Arthur Louis's album, Knocking on Heaven's Door (1974), with Eric Clapton. A period with Curtom Records, a label co-founded by Mayfield, resulted in four self-produced singles; none charted.

Chandler was again successful with disco-style music during the late 1970s, creating hits with his former producer Carl Davis which included "Get Down" (1978), "When You're #1" and "Does She Have a Friend?" Appointed executive vice-president of Davis' Chi-Sound Records, he worked with reggae singer Johnny Nash. A late-1970 interest in older musicians inspired disc jockey Wolfman Jack to organize a tour, including vintage acts such as Chandler.

"Duke of Earl" was sampled by Cypress Hill on "Hand on the Pump" from their album, Cypress Hill (1991), and Chandler's song "Hallelujah, I Love Her So" was sampled on their album Black Sunday (1993). In 1997, he received a Pioneer Award from the Rhythm and Blues Foundation.

In 1988, "Duke of Earl" was included on the soundtrack of Hairspray; "Groovy Situation" appeared on Anchorman: Music from the Motion Picture (2004). In 2002, "Duke of Earl" was inducted into the Grammy Hall of Fame. "Duke of Earl" was selected by the Rock and Roll Hall of Fame as one of its "500 Songs That Shaped Rock and Roll". In 2016, Chandler was honored in his hometown of Chicago by having a street named after him for his industry accomplishments, hit records, and his civic and philanthropic efforts for the city and its people.

His son, Defrantz Forest, sings with the Motown group The Originals.

Discography

Albums

Solo releases and collaborations:

Singles

References

Bibliography

Further reading
Pruter, Robert. Chicago Soul. Urbana, IL: University of Illinois Press, 1991,

External links
 Official Gene Chandler website
 Gene Chandler interview
 WGN Radio's Pete Mc Murray interviews the "Duke of Earl", Gene Chandler.
 

1937 births
Living people
20th-century African-American male singers
American male singers
African-American record producers
Record producers from Illinois
African-American songwriters
American music industry executives
American rhythm and blues singers
American soul musicians
American soul singers
Doo-wop musicians
Brunswick Records artists
Checker Records artists
Mercury Records artists
Northern soul musicians
Singers from Chicago
Vee-Jay Records artists
Songwriters from Illinois
Englewood Technical Prep Academy alumni
21st-century African-American people
American male songwriters